Byrsomyces is a fungal genus in the class Sordariomycetes. The relationship of this taxon to other taxa within the class is unknown (incertae sedis). A monotypic genus, Byrsomyces contains the single species Byrsomyces olivaceus.

References

Monotypic Sordariomycetes genera
Sordariomycetes enigmatic taxa